The Jules Falk Stradivarius is an antique violin made in 1723 by Italian luthier Antonio Stradivari of Cremona (1644-1737).  The instrument is currently owned and played by Russian violinist Viktoria Mullova. She acquired it from Sothebys in 1985, two years after her defection from the Soviet Union.

See also
 Stradivarius

Notes

References

External links
 

1723 works
Stradivari violins
Stradivari instruments